The  is a South African breed of light draught or harness horse; it is also suitable for riding. It was bred in the Western Cape region of South Africa in the early twentieth century, and resulted from cross-breeding of local mares with imported European stallions, particularly Friesians. The horses are usually black, though mares may be dark seal brown. A stud-book was started in 1983.

History 

The Vlaamperd derives from the now-extinct Hantam Horse or Cape Horse, a riding horse bred in the former Cape Province, particularly after 1814 when Lord Charles Somerset imported Thoroughbred stallions from Britain. Shortly after the end of the Second Boer War in 1902, a funeral director in Cape Town imported a few Friesian stallions. The Vlaamperd descends from the offspring of Hantam and other mares put to these stallions. There was some later influence from other breeds including the Cleveland Bay; an Ostfriesen and Alt-Oldenburger stallion named Kemp made a significant contribution to the development of the breed, and in the 1940s a stallion named Scheepers strongly influenced its evolution.

In 1983 a breed society, the SA Vlaamperd Breeders Society, was started in Bloemfontein; a stud-book was begun in the same year.

The conservation status of the breed is not clear – population data has not been reported to DAD-IS since 1999. In 2013 there were about 200 horses.

Characteristics 

The Vlaamperd stands on average  at the withers. Its appearance is similar to that of the Friesian, but less heavy. It has a thick mane and tail, a well-rounded croup, long legs and a high-arched neck.

Stallions are black, while mares may also be dark seal brown.

Use 

The Vlaamperd may be used as a riding horse, a carriage horse or for dressage.

Notes

References 

	

Horse breeds
Horse breeds originating in South Africa
Afrikaans words and phrases